Cows were a noise rock band from Minneapolis, Minnesota who formed in 1986 and disbanded in 1998. The band’s music mixed punk rock with surreal humour and copious amounts of noise played through distorted amplifiers and trumpet bleats, codifying them as a noise rock band. Throughout their career Cows released nine studio albums, all but one on the Minneapolis-based label Amphetamine Reptile Records. A star in honor of the Cows is on the outside mural of First Avenue.

History
Cows formed in 1986 with Kevin Rutmanis on bass, Thor Eisentrager on guitar, then front man Norm Rogers on vocals, and on drums Kevin's younger brother Sandris Rutmanis. Norm Rogers left the band in January 1987 to dedicate his time to drumming for the Jayhawks, later returning to play drums for Cows in 1990. Shannon Selberg become Cows’ front man in February 1987, providing both vocal and bugle duties. Sandris left the band in January 1998 and Cows disbanded thereafter.

After disbanding, Shannon Selberg went on to front The Heroine Sheiks.

Live performances
Cows were notorious for their raucous live performances. Acts the band have performed onstage include kicking people in the front row, spitting on the stage, throwing the microphone stand into the crowd, throwing food at the crowd, and drawing on themselves, among others. Lead singer Shannon Selberg's trademark is that he has a tattoo illustrating the game Hangman on his body that reads "F_CK" and another tattoo of an anchor with the word "DAD" on top of it. One reviewer wrote about the band's shows, "I have no doubt that the Cows know how to play their instruments. What I don't understand is why they refuse to tune them."

Legacy 
Cows have been honored with a star on the outside mural of the Minneapolis nightclub First Avenue, recognizing performers that have played sold-out shows or have otherwise demonstrated a major contribution to the culture at the iconic venue. Receiving a star "might be the most prestigious public honor an artist can receive in Minneapolis," according to journalist Steve Marsh.

Band members
Shannon Selberg – Vocals, Bugle, Trumpet, Trombone (1987–1998)
Kevin Rutmanis – Bass (1987–1998)
Thor Eisentrager – Guitar (1987–1998)
David van der Steen – Fifth Udder (1987–1992)
Sandris Rutmanis – Drums (1987–1988)
Tony Oliveri – Drums (1988–1990)
Norm Rogers – Drums (d. 2018) (1990–1995)
Freddy Votel – Drums (1995–1998)

Discography

Studio albums

Taint Pluribus Taint Unum – Treehouse Records, 1987
Daddy Has a Tail! – Amphetamine Reptile Records, 1989
Effete and Impudent Snobs – Amphetamine Reptile Records, 1990
Peacetika – Amphetamine Reptile Records, 1991
Cunning Stunts – Amphetamine Reptile Records, 1992
Sexy Pee Story – Amphetamine Reptile Records, 1993
Orphan's Tragedy – Amphetamine Reptile Records, 1994
Whorn – Amphetamine Reptile Records, 1996
Sorry in Pig Minor – Amphetamine Reptile Records, 1998

Singles and EPs

Chow 7" – Treehouse Records, 1988
Slap Back 7" – Amphetamine Reptile Records, 1990
Plowed EP – Amphetamine Reptile Records, 1992
Woman Inside 7" – Insipid Records, 1992
Cow Island 7" – Amphetamine Reptile Records, 1994
The Missing Letter Is You EP – Thick Records, 1998
Sugar Daddy Live Split Series Vol. 2 – Amphetamine Reptile Records, 2012 (split with the Melvins)

Compilations

Old Gold 1989-1991 – Amphetamine Reptile Records, 1995
Orpheus’ Travesty – KMFMT Records, 1998 (A retrospective album put together by Kevin Rutmanis and Freddy Votel and sold before their final concert)
Stunning Cunts – Amphetamine Reptile Records, 2014 (Demos from Cunning Stunts)
Stunning Cunts Vol. 2 – Amphetamine Reptile Records, 2015 (Demos from Cunning Stunts)

References

External links
 The Unofficial COWS Home Page

American noise rock music groups
Amphetamine Reptile Records artists
Indie rock musical groups from Minnesota
Musical groups established in 1987
Musical groups disestablished in 1998
Punk blues musical groups
Punk rock groups from Minnesota
Glitterhouse Records artists
Musical groups from the Twin Cities